The 1968 Nevada Southern Rebels football team was an American football team that represented Nevada Southern University (now University of Nevada, Las Vegas) as an independent during the 1968 NCAA College Division football season.

In the football program's first year, the Rebels were led by head coach Bill Ireland, played their home games at Cashman Field, and compiled an 8–1 record.

Schedule

References

Nevada Southern
UNLV Rebels football seasons
Nevada Southern Rebels football